Jason Williams may refer to:

Sports

Basketball
Jason Williams (basketball, born 1975), American basketball player; played collegiately at Marshall, Florida and multiple teams in the NBA
Jason Williams (basketball, born 1979), American basketball player; played collegiately at Radford
Jason Williams (basketball, born 1983), American basketball player; played collegiately at UTEP
Jason Williams or Jay Williams (basketball) (born 1981), American basketball player; played collegiately at Duke and professionally for the Chicago Bulls
Jayson Williams (born 1968), American basketball player

Other sports
Jason Williams (American football) (born 1986), American football player
Jason Williams (baseball) (born 1974), American baseball player
Jason Williams (cricketer) (born 1976), West Indian cricketer
Jason Williams (footballer, born 1984), Bermudian footballer
Jason Williams (footballer, born 1995), English footballer
Jason Williams (ice hockey) (born 1980), Canadian ice hockey player
Jason Williams (rugby league, born 1966), New Zealand rugby league player from Christchurch
Jason Williams (rugby league, born 1981), New Zealand rugby league player from Auckland

Others
Jason Williams (actor), actor, writer, and director
Jason Aldine Williams, known professionally as Jason Aldean (born 1977), American country singer
Jason Williams (politician) (born 1972), district attorney of New Orleans

See also
Jay Williams (disambiguation)